Ahmed Khenchil (born February 27, 1982) is a Tunisian footballer who played as a midfielder for the Libyan Premier League side Olomby.

References

1982 births
Living people
Tunisian footballers
Association football midfielders
Olympic Azzaweya SC players
Libyan Premier League players
Tunisian expatriate footballers
Tunisian expatriate sportspeople in Libya
Expatriate footballers in Libya